Irreligion in Botswana is not uncommon among Botswana. Though Christianity predominates, according to census results, 20% of the country do not identify with a religion.

See also
 Religion in Botswana
 Freedom of religion in Botswana
 Christianity in Botswana
 Islam in Botswana
 Demographics of Botswana

References

Religion in Botswana
Botswana
Botswana